Kagamuga International Airport  is the second biggest airport in Papua New Guinea (PNG) and is located in the Waghi Valley, 13 km north-east of Mount Hagen, the capital of Western Highlands Province of Papua New Guinea. The airport has one terminal and two runways, and is operated by its owner, National Airports Corporation of Papua New Guinea.

History
Kagamuga Airport was built in 1934. It was used by missionaries and the Australian administration for air service to Mount Hagen. It was renovated during World War II.

The airport underwent a renovation starting in 2013.
Constructed at a low level, the pre-existing terminal building was exposed to a water drainage problem and regularly got affected by waterlogging.

The reconstruction fell into the scope of the Civil Aviation Development Investment Program (CADIP) aimed to increase the safety, accessibility and reliability of the airports in PNG.
The Government of PNG and the Asian Development Bank (ADB) jointly funded the airport development project.

Reconstructed at a cost of approximately PGK 70m (US$23m), the main terminal building reopened in 2015.

A local artefact, the Mount Hagen axe, provided inspiration for the design of the newly constructed terminal, with the exteriors shaped like the axe and decorated in traditional patterns. The sewerage treatment system integrated into the construction of the building converts the liquid waste into fertiliser after separating it from the solid waste.

In 2018, the airport was closed for two days due to security issues arising after a dispute between guards and a local landowning group.

In 2019/2020, the Kagamuga International Airport was used to re-route the flights of Air Niugini from Wapenamanda due to maintenance works at the runways performed by the National Airports Corporation.

Airlines and destinations

Air Nuigini operates daily services to Port Moresby with Fokker 100 aircraft.
PNG Air operates daily services with ATR72-600 aircraft.

Facilities
Kagamuga International airport has one main terminal housing Air Niugini, Hevilift, and PNG Air. The airport facility has been rebuilt from the ground up, and reopened in November 2015. In 2019, the baggage x-ray machine was supplied by the Australian Government, Department of Home Affairs free of charge and delivered on a Royal Australian Air Force C130 aircraft from Port Moresby to Mount Hagen.

Runways
Kagamuga International Airport features two runways. The main runway bears the designation 12/30 and measures 2'190 m in length with 30 m in width. The second runway is designated as 08/26 and is 1'097 m long and 18 m wide.

Navigational aids equipment of both runways includes precision approach path indicator (PAPI), non-directional (radio) beacon (NDB), distance measuring equipment (DME), and approach and tower (TWR) facilities.

References

Airports in Papua New Guinea
Western Highlands Province